The Embassy of the Republic of Moldova to Ukraine is the diplomatic mission of the Republic of Moldova to Ukraine, which also functions as the non-resident embassy of Moldova to Armenia, Turkmenistan, Uzbekistan.

History
Diplomatic relations between Ukraine and Moldova have been established on 10 March 1992. The Embassy of Ukraine, Chișinău was opened in 1992. The Embassy of the Republic of Moldova in Kyiv was opened in 1992. During the 2022 Russian invasion of Ukraine, the embassy was closed on 4 March 2022 and reopened on 15 April 2022.

Previous Ambassadors
 Ion Borșevici (1993 - 1994)
 Ion Russu (1994 - 1998)
 Alexei Andrievschi  (1998 - 2003)
 Nicolae Cernomaz (2003 - 2005)
 Mihail Laur (2006)
 Sergiu Stati (2006 - 2009)
 Nicolae Gumenîi (2009 - 2010)
 Ion Stăvilă (2010-2015)
 Ruslan Bolbocean (2015-2021)
 Valeriu Chiveri (2021-present)

See also
 Moldova-Ukraine relations
 Foreign relations of Moldova
 Foreign relations of Ukraine
 Embassy of Ukraine, Chișinău
 Diplomatic missions in Ukraine
 Diplomatic missions of Moldova

References

External links
 Embassy of Moldova in Kyiv
 Ministry of Foreign Affairs of Ukraine
 

Diplomatic missions in Kyiv
Kyiv
Moldova–Ukraine relations